Demidova is a rural locality (a village) in Ust-Zulinskoye Rural Settlement, Yurlinsky District, Perm Krai, Russia. The population was 105 as of 2010. There are 2 streets.

Geography 
Demidova is located 19 km northeast of Yurla (the district's administrative centre) by road. Pestereva is the nearest rural locality.

References 

Rural localities in Yurlinsky District